Capoeta buhsei, the Namak scraper, is a species of cyprinid fish from the Lake Namak basin, Iran. It is usually less than 10 cm long.

References 

buhsei
Fish described in 1877